Jampur , is a Tehsil located in Punjab, Pakistan. It is capital of Jampur district. It is administratively subdivided into 19 Union Councils, two of which form the tehsil capital Jampur.

References

Rajanpur District
Tehsils of Punjab, Pakistan